Khamphanh Sonthanalay (born 31 October 1997) is a Laotian footballer who plays for Ubon Ratchathani in Thai League 3 and the Laos national team.

International career
Sonthanalay received his first call up to the senior national team for the 2016 AFC Solidarity Cup. He scored his first international goal on his debut, the game-winning goal of a 2–1 victory over Sri Lanka on 3 November 2016. He scored his second goal in as many games as he scored his team's only goal in their next match, a 1–4 defeat to Macau.

International goals
Scores and results list Laos's goal tally first.

International career statistics

References

External links
 

Living people
1997 births
Laotian footballers
Laos international footballers
Association football forwards